Adhi Kot is a village and one of the 51 Union Councils (administrative subdivisions) of Khushab District in the Punjab Province of Pakistan.

History
The Adhi Kot meteorite landed in the area on 1 May 1919.

References 

Union councils of Khushab District
Populated places in Khushab District